German-Pakistani or Pakistani-German (also unhyphenated) may refer to:
As an adjective, anything relating to Germany–Pakistan relations
Pakistanis in Germany
Germans in Pakistan